John Stephen Richardson (born 2 April 1950)  is an Anglican priest.

Educated  at Haslingden Grammar School and the University of Southampton, he was ordained in 1974  and began his career with  a curacy at St Michael’s, Bramcote. Next he was Priest in Charge of  Emmanuel Church, Radipole and Melcombe Regis; and then Stinsford, Winterborne Monkton and Witcombe. After this he was Vicar of Christ Church, Nailsea and then from 1985 to 1990 he was Adviser in Evangelism for the Diocese of Bath and Wells. In 1990 he became Provost of Bradford, a post he held until 2001. He has been Priest in charge of Holy Trinity, Margate since 2009. In 2016 he became a Priest in Romney Marsh Benefice.

References

1950 births
People educated at Haslingden Grammar School
Alumni of the University of Southampton
Provosts and Deans of Bradford
Living people